Force is a Bengali action drama thriller film directed by Raja Chanda and produced under the banners of Essel Vision Productions and NIdeas Creations & Productions Pvt Ltd.The film features actors Prosenjit Chatterjee and Arpita Pal in the lead roles. It is an unofficial remake of 2013 Tamil movie Haridas.

Plot 
Force is a new commercial Bengali movie, is based on the love and relationship of a father and a son. Arjun (Prosenjit Chatterjee) is an encounter specialist police officer whose goal is to eradicate both crime and criminals from the society. He lost his wife during the birth of his son, Abhimanyu. His son is an autistic patient and suffers from neurodevelopmental problems.

Cast 
 Prosenjit Chatterjee—ACP Arjun/Encounter specialist
 Arpita Pal—Labanya, a school teacher
 Arya Dasgupta—Abhimanyu 
 Joyjit Banerjee
 Debranjan Nag
 Sudipta Ballav, the main antagonist and leader of coal mafia gang, operated from Jharkhand
 Jayanta Hore
 Tathagata Mukherjee
 Ena Saha
 Kamaleshwar Mukherjee as Police Commissioner
 Sumit Ganguly as sports coach

Soundtrack

References

External links 
 

2014 films
Bengali remakes of Tamil films
Bengali-language Indian films
2010s Bengali-language films
Films directed by Raja Chanda